This article lists Plaid Cymru's election results in UK parliamentary, European parliamentary, and Welsh Assembly elections.

Summary of electoral performance

Westminster elections

Welsh Assembly / Senedd elections

European Parliament elections

Elections results

1929 general election

1931 general election

1935 general election

By-elections 1935–1945

1945 general election

By-elections 1945–1950

1950 general election

1951 general election

By-elections 1951–1955

1955 general election

By-elections 1955–1959

1959 general election

By-elections 1959–1964

1964 general election

By-elections 1964–1966

1966 general election

By-elections 1966–1970

1970 general election

By-elections 1970–1974

February 1974 general election

October 1974 general election

1979 general election

By-elections 1979–1983

1983 general election

By-elections 1983–1987

1987 general election

By-elections 1987–1992

Witherden was a joint candidate with the Green Party of England and Wales.

1992 general election

By-elections 1992–1997

1997 general election

By-elections 1997–2001

2001 general election

By-elections 2001–2005

2005 general election

By-elections 2005–2010

2010 general election

By-elections 2010–2015

2015 general election

By-elections 2015–2017

2017 general election

By-elections 2017–2019

2019 general election

References

F. W. S. Craig, Chronology of British Parliamentary By-elections 1833-1987
F. W. S. Craig, British parliamentary election results 1918–1949 (3 ed.). Chichester: Parliamentary Research Services. 
F. W. S. Craig, British parliamentary election results 1950–1973 (2 ed.). Chichester: Parliamentary Research Services. 
F. W. S. Craig, British parliamentary election results, 1974–1983. Chichester: Parliamentary Research Services. 
C. Rallings & M. Thrasher, British Parliamentary Election Results 1983–1997, (Aldershot: Ashgate, 1999)
C. Rallings & M. Thrasher, Britain Votes 6, (Aldershot: Ashgate 1998)
Electoral Commission, Compiled by Colin Rallings & Michael Thrasher, Election 2001 - The Official Results, (London: Politicos, 2001)
Beti Jones, Etholiadau'r ganrif 

Plaid Cymru
Election results by party in the United Kingdom